Hardeland hydroelectric power station is a power plant in Etne in western Norway. The site is owned and operated by Haugaland Kraft.

The station uses water from two sets of reservoirs. Hardeland H is a 400 m vertical fall from Løkjelsvatnet, while Hardeland K uses Grindheimsvatnet, Ilsvatnet, Basurde-/Krokavatnet and Hjørnås via a 305 m fall from the Hjørnås lake.

Hardeland is connected to the grid with a 22 kV line to Litledalen. The site uses three pelton wheels with 14 MW generators, and average yearly output is 123 GWh.

See also

References

External links 
 Power plants owned and operated by Haugaland Kraft

Hydroelectric power stations in Norway